Neil Barrett, (born 1986) better known by his stage name Deckscar, is a dubstep DJ and music producer from Hertfordshire, England. Actively Producing and DJing since 2010, his first release was in 2011 "Cross Over EP" with Bill Posters.

Whilst being a singer/songwriter for a rock band for over 7 years, Neil always had a passion for producing music. Whilst studying at University in London, as a budding dance music producer he used his location and the student nights run by the University to get sets at Electroworks in Angel and then clubs such as Fabric and Ministry of Sound.
 
From a background in creating music, he quickly started to put together sets of originals, remixes, and bootlegs of his own design, incorporating classic anthems with his super heavy bass creations to come up with sets of his own design. It was October 2011 when he released his first track as a producer, "Feel Good", which reached number 40 in the Beatport charts for the month of September. As a result of his efforts, he has now worked with acts such as Natasha Bedingfield, Daniel Bedingfield, Chicane, Cutline, and so on.

Deckscar Recently became an ambassador for a Charity Global Angels  Global Angels an international charity founded by Molly Bedingfield. Molly's children Daniel Bedingfield, Natasha Bedingfield and Nikola Rachelle have contributed greatly to the organisation and the organisation is a children's charity meant to stop child trafficking and child poverty.

Career
Whilst being a singer/songwriter for a rock band for over 7 years, Deckscar always had a passion for club music and began fusing this style with his rock outfit. In 2010 he took this one step forward by getting himself a set of decks. During his years studying at university in London, Deckscar took advantage of his location and the regular student nights on all over the city.

After securing regular DJ sets at popular club Electroworks in Angel, and subsequently world-renowned clubs such as Fabric and Ministry of Sound within the first year of playing. He was offered a weekly residency at Punk on Oxford Street and at The Egg in King's Cross. Since then he has had the opportunity to play at festivals such as Rhythms of The World in Hertfordshire, The V-Festival in Chelmsford, UK and Pacha in Mallorca, Spain.

Deckscar's SJ sets became well known for being a roller-coaster of serious music, riding between drum and bass, dubstep, electro house, and moombahton. 

Having come from a background of creating music, he quickly started to put together sets of original, remixes and tunes of his own design to which the crowds went wild. Incorporating classic anthems with his super heavy bass creations. As a producer he released his first track "Feel Good" in September 2011 getting to number 40 in the beatport charts, which was a fantastic achievement for a first release. He has worked with acts such as Natasha and Daniel Bedingfield, X-Factor Uk's Gamu, Hani, and Cutline. Deckscar has also had a number of press feature's including Computer Music Magazine praising his production skills.

DJ Excision has been playing "Deckscar's remix of The Prodigy's "Voodoo People" on Tour since 2011 and also featured the remix on his Shambhala 2012 Dubstep Mix.

ReMixes

References

External links
  Deckscar's website
  Deckscar's Soundcloud
  Deckscar's Youtube

1986 births
Living people
English DJs
English electronic musicians
Breakbeat musicians
Dubstep musicians
Remixers
Musicians from Hertfordshire
Electronic dance music DJs